Ramsey Lewis and his Gentle-men of Swing (later rereleased as Swingin') is the debut album by American jazz pianist Ramsey Lewis, recorded in 1956 and released on the Argo label.

Reception

AllMusic stated: "Lewis sounds like a cross between John Lewis and Oscar Peterson ... worth taking a chance on".

Track listing
All compositions by Ramsey Lewis except as indicated
 "Carmen" (Georges Bizet) - 4:30  
 "I'll Remember April" (Gene de Paul, Patricia Johnston, Don Raye) - 4:07
 "The Wind" (Russ Freeman) - 4:00   
 "Bei Mir Bist du Schön" (Jacob Jacobs, Sholom Secunda, Sammy Cahn, Saul Chaplin) - 3:13  
 "My Funny Valentine" (Lorenz Hart, Richard Rodgers) - 3:10   
 "Fantasia for Drums" - 5:45   
 "Dee's New Blues" (El Dee Young) - 5:45 
 "Tres" - 4:45   
 "Limelight" (Gerry Mulligan) - 2:17

Personnel 
Ramsey Lewis - piano
El Dee Young - bass
Issac "Red" Holt - drums

References 

 

1956 debut albums
Ramsey Lewis albums
Argo Records albums
Albums produced by Leonard Chess
Albums produced by Phil Chess